Góry  is a village in the administrative district of Gmina Markuszów, within Puławy County, Lublin Voivodeship, in eastern Poland.

In 2009, the village had an officially reported population of 335.

References

Villages in Puławy County